Taghenkoh-e Shomali Rural District is a rural district (dehestan) in Taghenkoh District, Firuzeh County, Razavi Khorasan province, Iran. At the 2006 census, its population (including Hemmatabad, which was subsequently detached from the rural district and promoted to city status) was 15,686, in 3,964 families; excluding Hemmatabad, its population (as of 2006) was 14,422, in 3,619 families.  The rural district has 31 villages.

References 

Rural Districts of Razavi Khorasan Province
Firuzeh County